The culture of Balochistan, or simply Baloch culture is defined in terms of religious values, Balochi and Brahui language, literature and traditional values of mutual respect. It has its roots in the Urdu, Balochi, Brahui, Sindhi, and Pashto. Folk music, handicraft, drama and Balochi cinema plays a significant role in Baloch culture. Quetta, the provincial capital of Balochistan, has several beautiful historical monuments such as Pirak, Chaukhandi tombs and Quaid-e-Azam Residency.

Balochistan celebrates its culture day every year where people from different villages gather together to organise several types of cultural programs. It marks its historical significances across the provincial state. It includes folk music, dance, craft exhibition and other activities.

Beliefs
Likewise other people around the world, Balochistann people are also known for believing in supernatural powers such as wind, and sea. They believe that crossing the boundaries of supernatural power "nazzar" (evil eye) and "jinn" (demons, spirits), can affect or curse a human life.

Background 
One of the most important parts of the cultural identity of Baloch people is the Pashtu and Saraiki languages, "99th most spoken language in the world". This language is spoken only by native people as it is one of the toughest languages. Besides language, Baloch dressing has been greatly influenced by the entire country. Their nomadic life style is completely different than other provincial states of the country.

Despite celebrating several colourful festivals peacefully and traditionally, there is also an unlawful tradition or settlement practice called Baad. Baad (dispute resolution) is an "unlawful marriage custom" found in its Harnai district that is used to make settlements between the two enemies. To be more specific, a girl is given in a compensation to a victim whose brother or any family member has been killed/murdered by the girl's very close relatives such as brother or father. All the decisions related to this custom are made by a single individual called jirga, who heads the tribal court. The young woman is then given to deceased's family "without her consent".

Food

Baloch cuisine is noted for its traditional and unique food culture. Dalag is among prominent foods which is regarded by the Baloch people as a core element of their culture and identity. "Sajji" is another dish that has now become familiar in other parts of the country.

Festivals 

Balochistan is the only state in Pakistan where "Jashn-e-Kalat" festival is being celebrated. This festival involves in circus performances, rifle shooting and other cultural programs and shows. It was named after an emperor who ruled this region. The festival is celebrated to honour the diversified culture of Balochistan state.

References 

Culture of Balochistan, Pakistan